Alan Mynett (born 5 August 1966) is a former English cricketer.  Mynett was a right-handed batsman who played primarily as a wicket-keeper.

Mynett represented the Yorkshire Cricket Board in two List A matches against the Gloucestershire Cricket Board and Buckinghamshire in the 1999 NatWest Trophy.  In his two List A matches, he scored 38 runs at a batting average of 19.00, with a high score of 37.  In the field he took one catch.

References

External links

1966 births
Living people
Cricketers from Barnsley
English cricketers
Yorkshire Cricket Board cricketers
English cricketers of 1969 to 2000
Wicket-keepers